Utecha trivia is a European species of leafhopper.

Description
The males have a distinctive mark and a light yellowish colour base with black streaks starting from clavus to the forewing. The same streaks can be found along the cubital vein and radial veins and on the vertex, close to the eye. Females are completely yellowish-brown with slight amount of dark spots.

Habitat
The species like to feed on horseshoe vetch, Hippocrepis comosa.

References

Ulopinae
Hemiptera of Europe
Insects described in 1821